Sanskrit College and University (erstwhile Sanskrit College) is a state university located in Kolkata, West Bengal, India. It focuses on liberal arts, offering both UG and PG degrees in Ancient Indian and world history, Bengali, English, Sanskrit language, Linguistics, and traditional orientation learning (Advaita Vedanta) except Pali in which only UG degree is being offered.

History

Sanskrit College was founded on 1 January 1824, during the Governor-Generalship of Lord Amherst, based on a recommendation by James Prinsep and Thomas Babington Macaulay among others.

Mahesh Chandra Nyayratna Bhattacharyya, the scholar of Sanskrit, was the principal of the college for over 18 years. He was made a Companion of the Most Eminent Order of the Indian Empire (C.I.E.), and a member of the Most Eminent Order of the Indian Empire.

He played a crucial role in colonial Bengal's educational reformation. He revived the tol system in Sanskrit education, and introduced titles or "Upadhi".

The institution rose to prominence during the principalship of Ishwar Chandra Vidyasagar in 1851, who admitted students from other than the Brahmin and Baidya caste. In particular, the tol or traditional Indian training school model was incorporated as a department in the 1870s. 

From 1824 until 1851 the college did not have the post of principal but was headed by a secretary. From 1851 the college was headed by a principal.

Transformation into a university
The Sanskrit College and University, West Bengal Bill 2015, aimed at transforming Sanskrit College into a university was passed in West Bengal Assembly on 17 December 2015. 
The university was established vide The Sanskrit College and University, West Bengal Act 2015 on 19 February 2016 and became functional on 15 June 2016 when the first vice-chancellor, Dilipkumar Mohanta, joined the institute.

Campus
The Sanskrit College and University is located on College Street in central Kolkata, India. Its centrality is heightened by its proximity to Hindu School, Presidency University, Kolkata, the University of Calcutta, and the Indian Coffee House.

Organization and Administration

Governance
The governor of West Bengal is the chancellor of the Sanskrit College and University. The Vice-chancellor of the Sanskrit College and University is the chief executive officer of the university. Soma Bandyopadhyay is the current Vice-chancellor of the university.

Departments
Sanskrit College and University consist of the departments of Ancient Indian & World History, Bengali, English, Linguistics, Philosophy, Pali, Sanskrit, and Traditional Orientation Learning(Advaita Vedanta, Panini Vyakarana, and Sahitya).

Academics

Courses
Sanskrit College and University offer different undergraduate and postgraduate courses: 

 Three-year Undergraduate Degree (B.A. Honours) courses: Ancient Indian & World History, Bengali, English, Linguistics, Philosophy, Pali, Sanskrit, Advaita Vedanta, Panini Vyakarana, and Sahitya.
 Two-year Postgraduate Degree (M.A.) Courses: Ancient Indian & World History, Bengali, English, Philosophy, Sanskrit, and Linguistics.
Two-year Acharya degree(equivalent to M.A.) in Traditional Orientation Learning (Advaita Vedanta).

Central Library
The central library of the Sanskrit College and University is a veritable goldmine for researchers. It contains over 2,00,000 books and 25,000 manuscripts, including several very rare manuscripts.  The university has also started a massive digitization program such that it can place these 25,000 manuscripts in the cultural commons.

Sanskrit Charcha Kendra, Nabadwip
The Sanskrit College and University has established a Sanskrit Charcha Kendra, in Nabadwip, Nadia, West Bengal. This state-of-the-art research center provides an opportunity to research scholars, and academicians to harvest the traditional Indic knowledge base already present in University's repository and to take Indological and Sanskrit studies to the future.

Notable alumni

Saradaranjan Ray
Bijoy Krishna Goswami
Surendranath Dasgupta
Krishna Kanta Handique
Mahanambrata Brahmachari
Bimal Krishna Matilal
Abanindranath Tagore
Ishwar Chandra Vidyasagar

See also 
List of Sanskrit universities in India
Education in India
Education in West Bengal

References

External links
 

Academic institutions associated with the Bengal Renaissance
Universities and colleges in Kolkata
Educational institutions established in 1824
Schools in Colonial India
19th century in Kolkata
Sanskrit universities in India
1824 establishments in India